The DAF-4 gene encodes for the only type II receptor of TGF-beta signaling pathway in the worm Caenorhabditis elegans, with the ligands Daf-7 or Dbl-1. When binds to the ligand Daf-7, Daf-4 complexed with the type I receptor Daf-1, and activated the Smad Protein Daf-8/14. By contrast, when binds to Dbl-1, Daf-4 complexed with the Sma-6 type I receptor, and activated the Sma-2/3/4.

References 

Caenorhabditis elegans genes